Botoșani is the capital city of Botoșani County, in the northern part of Moldavia, Romania. Today, it is best known as the birthplace of many celebrated Romanians, including Mihai Eminescu, Nicolae Iorga and Grigore Antipa.

Origin of the name
The name of the city probably has its origin in the name of a boyar family called Botaș, whose name can be found in old records from the time of Prince Stephen the Great (late 15th century) as one of the most important families of Moldavia, records which trace it back to the 11th century.

History
Botoșani is first mentioned in 1439, in which one chronicle says that "the Mongols came and pillaged all the way to Botușani". The town is then mentioned only during the conflicts between Moldavia and Poland: several battles were fought near the town, in 1500, 1505 and 1509. During the reign of Petru Rareș, the town was set ablaze by the Poles. It was during his reign then that we know that the town had a hill fort.

In the 15th century, it was still not a fully-fledged town, but archeological evidence shows that it was a pre-urban settlement. During the second part of the 14th century, some Transylvanian colonists (most likely German or Hungarian) settled in Botoșani. Additionally, a large community of Armenian traders settled in the 14th or 15th centuries.

At the junction of several commercial roads including the "Moldavian Road", which linked Iași to Hotin, the city was initially a market town. By 1579 it already had "the biggest and the oldest fair of Moldavia".

A large Jewish community was established in the city during the 17th century, which was the second biggest and most important in Moldavia until the end of the 19th century.

During World War II, Botoșani was captured on 7 April 1944 by Soviet troops of the 2nd Ukrainian Front in the course of the Uman–Botoșani Offensive.

Some of the most famous Romanian cultural representatives such as Mihai Eminescu, Romania's national poet, and Nicolae Iorga, the famous Romanian historian, were born in Botoșani. Contemporary poet Maria Baciu also hails from Botoșani.

It is also the location of A.T. Laurian National College, founded in 1859, one of Romania's oldest and most prestigious pre-university educational institutions.

Demographics

Historically Jewish people constituted a large part of the population, reaching 15,502 (53%) at its peak in 1942.

As of 2011 census data, Botoșani has a population of 106,847, a decrease from the figure recorded at the 2002 census, making it the 19th largest city in Romania. The estimated population as of July 2018 was 120,535. The ethnic makeup was as follows:
 Romanians: 98.1%
 Roma: 1%
 Lipovans: 0.6%
 Jews: 0.06%
 Other: 0.24%

Culture
Boasting a rich cultural life, the city of Botoșani has long produced major personalities in science and culture. Botoșani natives like Mihai Eminescu, Nicolae Iorga and Octav Onicescu have become major figures in diverse disciplines, and many have distinct claims to relevance not just within Romania, but on a worldwide level.

Cultural institutions
 "Ciomac Cantemir House" (historic monument dating from 1800), today the headquarters of the "Ștefan Luchian" foundation;
 "Nicolae Iorga" Memorial House, situated in one of the houses where great historian Nicolae Iorga passed his childhood. Two sections of the house hold a photo documentary exposition and an exhibition of Iorga's first written editions. Another section holds a regularly updated library of history. The Iorga family's salon boasts an interior dating from the final decades of the 19th century;
 "Octav Onicescu" Memorial Museum, realized in October 1995, houses the furniture that once belonged to the mathematician and philosopher Octav Onicescu. In addition, there are also his manuscripts, writings, diplomas, books from his personal library, family photos, and decorations, offering an intimate portrait of a Romanian polymath;
 County Museum (Ethnographic section), housed in a fine example of late-18th-century architecture that once served as the house of Manolache Iorga, the grandfather of the great historian Nicolae Iorga. Open to the public since 1989, the museum displays the most important elements of the area's rural culture; artifacts of the principal occupations (farming, animal husbandry, hunting, fishing, and beekeeping), traditional crafts (spinning, embroidery, furriery, pottery), traditional costumes, and other customary and traditional crafts specific to the Botoşani region.
 County Museum (Historical and Archaeological section), housed in a historic monument dating from 1913, presents in its 17 rooms the story of Botoșani's evolution from prehistory to the present. Exhibits include the dawn of civilization in the region, from the paleolithic era, to the neolithic era (with Cucuteni ceramics), and finishing with the Bronze and Iron Ages. More notable displays include weapons made of sharpened stone and bone, decorated pottery, anthropomorphic and zoomorphic figurines, seals belonging to the lords of Moldavia, and historic jewelry. The museum also includes artifacts from the oldest human habitation found in southeastern Europe, discovered in Ripiceni and partially reconstructed and displayed inside the museum.
 "Ștefan Luchian" Art Galleries, the fine-arts section of the County Museum, pays tribute to Botoșani's rich artistic heritage, including the paintings of Ștefan Luchian, Octav Băncilă, and many other contemporary artists; the works of many renowned illustrators, foremost among them Ligia Macovei, the most celebrated illustrator of the poems of Eminescu; the sculptures of Iulia Onila and Dan Covătaru; and the tapestries of Cela Neamţu, Aspazia Burduja, and Ileana Balotă;
 "Mihai Eminescu" National Theatre; the building was opened in 1914, partially destroyed by the bombings of 1944, and restored in 1958 and again in the 1990s. The theatre hosts a team of actors whose remarkable evolution was crowned by their winning of the Grand Prize at the International Theatre Festival in 2001 at Piatra Neamț. The Grand Hall of the theatre also hosts numerous other cultural activities, of which the most notable are the concerts of the Botoșani State Philharmonic.

 "Vasilache" Puppet Theatre; home to a troupe of puppeteers appreciated not only in Romania but also abroad, as evidenced by their win at the International Puppet Festival in Silistra, June 2001. Every two years the theatre organizes the International Gala of Puppet Theatre, which brings to Botoșani the most prestigious names in puppet theatre, from Romania and abroad;
 Botoșani National Philharmonica, who generally perform in a 19th-century neoclassical building known as Vila Ventura, are renowned all over the county, its artists often finding themselves invited on a permanent basis to participate in concerts throughout Romania and abroad. The Philharmonic is the principal organizer of the series of tributes to George Enescu, tributes which benefit each year from the presence of the great personalities of Romanian art and culture;
 "Rapsozii Botoșanilor" Ensemble, a long-standing folkloric orchestra with a history stretching back for decades, presents a multitude of folkloric songs from Moldavia and the rest of Romania under the direction of its renowned leader, Maestro Ioan Cobâlă. The ensemble has long been associated with the greatest names in Moldavian folklore, such as Sofia Vicoveanca, Laura Lavric, and Daniela Condurache, and continues to nurture the next generation of folkloric talent. The artists of the ensemble are recognized nationally and internationally by virtue of their television appearances and their winning of numerous prizes;
 "Mihai Eminescu" County Library, housed in a building known as the "Casa Moscovici," a late-19th-century structure that combines French and German architectural elements in a unique synthesis. The library contains a collection of around 380,000 volumes;
 The Old Centre (The Old Downtown) is the oldest part of the city from an architectural standpoint, bringing together a large number of commercial buildings dating from the 17th and 18th centuries.

A series of historic churches built by the Lords of Moldavia :
"Uspenia" Church - founded by Elena Rareş, the wife of king Petru Rareș, in 1552; the site of the christening of Mihai Eminescu.
"Sfântu Gheorghe" Church - founded by Elena Rareş in 1551.
"Sfântu Nicolae" Church (Popăuți) - founded by Stephen the Great in 1496. The monastery is surrounded by walls, giving the appearance of a small citadel.

Botoșani boasts many other constructions of special architectural value, among them: the Antipa House, from the end of the 19th century; the Bolfosu House, from the beginning of the 19th century; the Silion House, dating from 1900; and the City Hall, built at the end of the 18th century in an eclectic style with German influences.

 Botosánka is a dance of the Csángós.
 National Jewish Theater (Romania)

Climate

Transportation

Private entities operate 5 minivans lines.  

The main public transportation service is a tram network with two lines, 101 and 102.  Historically, Botoşani has used trams from the former Eastern Bloc, but began in 2019 to replace them with a modernized system.  In the interim, the trams have been replaced with buses.

Sport
FC Botoșani is the football team that represents Botoșani.

International relations

Twin towns — Sister cities
Botoșani is twinned with:
 Laval, Canada
 Uman, Ukraine

Notable residents
 Florin Andone (born 1993), Romanian professional footballer 
 Grigore Antipa (1867–1944), Romanian biologist 
 Gheorghe Avramescu (1884–1945), Romanian Lieutenant General during World War II 
 Octav Băncilă (1872–1944), Romanian realist painter and left-wing activist
 Israil Bercovici (1921–1988), Jewish Romanian dramaturg, playwright and director
 Max Blecher, (1909–1938), Jewish Romanian writer
 Demostene Botez (1893–1973), Romanian poet and prose writer
 Pascal Covici (1885–1964), Romanian Jewish-American book publisher and editor
 Georgeta Damian (born 1976), Romanian female rower and winner of five Olympic gold medals
 Mihai Eminescu (1850–1889, born Mihail Eminovici), influential Romanian poet, novelist and journalist 
 Reuven Feuerstein (1921–2014), Israeli clinical, developmental, and cognitive psychologist 
Israel Freedman (1878–1934) Jewish Romanian-American Yiddish journalist 
 Alexandru Graur (1900–1988) Romanian linguist
 Nicolae Iorga (1871–1940), Romanian historian, politician, literary critic, memoirist, poet and playwright
 Isidore Isou (1925–2007, born Isidor Goldstein), Romanian-born French poet, dramaturge, novelist, economist, and visual artist
 Dan Lungu (born 1969), Romanian novelist, short story writer, poet and dramatist
 Dan Lupu (born 1983), Romanian actor 
 Mime Misu (1888–1953, born Mișu Rosescu), Romanian ballet dancer, pantomime artist, film actor and director
 Octav Onicescu (1892–1983), Romanian mathematician and founder of the Romanian school of probability theory and statistics
 Elie Radu (1853–1931), Romanian civil engineer and academic
 Henric Sanielevici (1875–1951), Romanian journalist and literary critic
 Ion Sân-Giorgiu (1893–1950), Romanian modernist poet, dramatist and essayist, and far-right politician
 Artur Stavri (1869–1928), Romanian poet
 Adolf Josef Storfer (1888–1944), Austrian lawyer turned journalist and publisher

References

Further reading

External links

 
 

 
Cities in Romania
Capitals of Romanian counties
Localities in Western Moldavia
Shtetls
Populated places in Botoșani County